Garudinia triangulata is a moth of the family Erebidae first described by Jeremy Daniel Holloway in 2001. It is found on Borneo. The habitat consists of lowland dipterocarp forests and from lower montane forests.

The wingspan is 9–10 mm.

References

Cisthenina
Moths described in 2001